Nicola Danieli (born 26 March 1998) is an Italian footballer who plays as a midfielder.

Club career

ChievoVerona 
Born in Sirmione, Danileli was a youth exponent of ChievoVerona.

Loan to Virtus Verona 
On 13 July 2018, Danieli was signed by Serie C side Virtus Verona on a season-long loan deal. On 16 September he made his Serie C debut for Virtus Verona as a substitute replacing Luca Manarin in the 70th minute of a 2–0 away defeat against Fermana. One week later, on 23 September he played his first match as a starter for Virtus Verona, a 2–0 home defeat against Monza, he was replaced after 46 minutes by Giulio Fasolo. On 1 December he played his first entire match for Virtus Verona, a 2–1 home defeat against Sambenedettese. On 26 December he scored his first professional goal in the 22nd minute of a 3–1 home win over Gubbio. Danieli ended his loan to Virtus Verona with 19 appearances and 1 goal.

On 17 July 2019, Danieli returned to Serie C club Virtus Verona with another season-long loan deal. On 25 August he played his first match of the season as a substitute replacing Filippo Pellacani in the 56th minute of a 3–1 home defeat against Padova. On 22 September, Danieli played his first match of the season as a starter, a 3–2 home win over Triestina, he was replaced after 77 minutes by Manuel Di Paola. One week later, on 29 September, he was sent-off with a double yellow card in the 23rd minute of a 2–1 home defeat against Vicenza Virtus. On 19 October he scored his first goal of the season in the 7th minute of a 2–1 away win over Sambenedettese. Danieli ended his second season on loan to Virus Verona with 19 appearances, 1 goal and 1 assist.

Virtus Verona 
On 31 July 2020, after 2 years on loan, Danieli joined to Virtus Verona on a free-transfer and he signed a 2-year contract.

Career statistics

Club

References

External links
 

1998 births
Living people
Sportspeople from the Province of Brescia
Footballers from Lombardy
Italian footballers
Association football midfielders
Serie C players
A.C. ChievoVerona players
Virtus Verona players